Ciaran Patrick Lennon (born 1947) is a Dublin-based Irish artist known for his minimalist large scale paintings.

He was chosen to represent Ireland at the 1993 São Paulo Biennial in Brazil. In the same year, Lennon was elected to Aosdána (an Irish State honour conferred on artists whose work has made an outstanding contribution to the creative arts in Ireland).

He has been described as ‘one of the most important Irish painters currently working in the field of non-objective art’. Some of his most well-known work is ‘Porous Plane’, which originated from his Folded/Unfolded Paintings of 1969–1972.

Collections
Irish Museum of Modern Art
National Gallery of Ireland
Contemporary Irish Art Society 
The Hugh Lane Municipal Gallery 
Trinity College, Dublin
Kamarsky collection in New York
Fogg Museum, Boston
Arken Museum of Modern Art, Copenhagen.

References 

1947 births
Living people
20th-century Irish painters
21st-century Irish painters
Artists from Dublin (city)